Parliamentary elections were held in Lithuania on 12 and 13 May 1923. The Lithuanian Popular Peasants' Union emerged as the largest party in the second Seimas, winning 16 of the 78 seats. Labour Federation, Lithuanian Christian Democratic Party and the Farmers' Association managed to achieve absolute majority in the Seimas.

Results

References

Lithuania
Parliamentary
Lithuania
Parliamentary elections in Lithuania